"Glitter" is a song by New Zealand musician Benee. It was released as a single on 3 July 2019 as the fourth and final single from Benee's debut extended play Fire on Marzz. The song peaked at number 7 on the New Zealand singles chart and has been certified gold. The song went viral on TikTok in November 2019.

Critical reception
In an album review, George Fenwick from The New Zealand Herald called the song "A joyous track that swells and shines like an adolescent crush. Djeisan Suskov's twangy guitars gleam as bright as the title suggests, as Benee simply asks someone to hang out with her."

Alison Gallagher from Music Feeds called the song "a hazy, reverb-soaked yet deceptively energetic bop."

Charts

Weekly charts

Year-end charts

Certifications

References

2019 singles
2019 songs
Benee songs
Republic Records singles
Songs written by Benee
Songs written by Josh Fountain
Song recordings produced by Josh Fountain
APRA Award winners